Friedia Niimura is a Japanese businessperson. Born in Germany, she lived in the USA until she was 13, then moved to Japan for approximately 10 years, working as a tarento under the stage name , but returned to the United States in 2005. As of 2022, she is the owner of a Los Angeles stationery shop called Paper Plant.

References

Japanese actresses
Japanese female models
Living people
Year of birth missing (living people)